Roman Mykhaylovych Serdyuk (born 24 February 2001) is a Ukrainian professional footballer who plays as a goalkeeper for Ukrainian club Prykarpattia Ivano-Frankivsk.

References

External links
 Profile on Prykarpattia Ivano-Frankivsk official website
 
 

2001 births
Living people
People from Yaremche
Ukrainian footballers
Association football goalkeepers
FC Prykarpattia Ivano-Frankivsk (1998) players
Ukrainian First League players
Sportspeople from Ivano-Frankivsk Oblast